Hagemann's ester, ethyl 2-methyl-4-oxo-2-cyclohexenecarboxylate, is an organic compound that was first prepared and described in 1893 by German chemist Carl Hagemann. The compound is used in organic chemistry as a reagent in the synthesis of many natural products including sterols, trisporic acids, and terpenoids.

Preparation

Hagemann's approach 
Methylene iodide and two equivalents of ethyl acetoacetate react in the presence of sodium methoxide to form the diethyl ester of 2,4-diacetyl pentane. This precursor is treated with base to induce cyclization. Finally, heat is applied to generate Hagemann's ester.

Knoevenagel's approach 
Soon after Hagemann, Emil Knoevenagel described a modified procedure to produce the same intermediate diethyl ester of 2,4-diacetyl pentane using 
formaldehyde and two equivalents of ethyl acetoacetate which undergo condensation in the presence of a catalytic amount of piperidine.

Newman and Lloyd approach 
2-Methoxy-1,3-butadiene and ethyl-2-butynoate undergo a Diels-Alder reaction to generate a precursor which is hydrolyzed to obtain Hagemann's ester. By varying the substituents on the butynoate starting material, this approach allows for different C2 alkylated Hagemann's ester derivatives to be synthesized.

Mannich and Forneau approach

Original 
Methyl vinyl ketone, ethyl acetoacetate, and diethyl-methyl-(3-oxo-butyl)-ammonium iodide react to form a cyclic aldol product. Sodium methoxide is added to generate Hagemann's ester.

Variations 
Methyl vinyl ketone and ethyl acetoacetate undergo aldol cyclization in the presence of catalytic pyrrolidinum acetate or Triton B or sodium ethoxide to produce Hagemann's ester. This variant is a type of Robinson annulation.

Uses
Hagemann's ester has been used as a key building block in many syntheses. For example, a key intermediate for the fungal hormone trisporic acid was made by its alkylation and it has been used to make sterols. Other authors have used it in inverse-electron-demand Diels–Alder reactions leading to sesquiterpene dimers or in reactions forming simple derivatives.

References 

Ethyl esters
Reagents for organic chemistry
Cyclohexenes